1920 The Wrekin by-election was held on 7 February 1920.  The by-election was held due to the death of the incumbent Coalition Liberal MP, Sir Charles Henry Bt.  It was won by the Independent Conservative candidate Charles Palmer, who was backed by Horatio Bottomley's Independent Parliamentary Group.

Although forced out of Parliament through bankruptcy in 1912, Bottomley had come back as an Independent in his old seat of Hackney South in 1918. He formed the Independent Parliamentary Group and sensed the growing unpopularity of the Coalition and the reluctance of many working men and women to give wholehearted support to a Labour Party still feared as introducing the novelty of socialism to British politics. Bottomley knew from his own brand of populist, jingoistic, politics that, as Palmer put it, "there is an immense body of sound opinion in the working classes which ranges itself on the side of King and Constitution." In this climate, Bottomley understood that here was an opportunity to try add create a new third force in Parliament, anticipating the upsurge of opinion which was to produce good results for Anti-Waste candidates in the coming months. He persuaded Palmer to stand for election in The Wrekin and in a three-cornered contest against a Coalition Liberal and a Labour candidate, Palmer – without the advantages of local organisation or local connections and strongly supported by Bottomley himself – won a stunning and unexpected victory. The Coalition candidate, John Bayley, who had been closely associated with the previous MP and was well known locally as principal of Wellington College could only come in a poor third place.

Palmer died on 25 October 1920 from double pneumonia and pleurisy after catching a chill during a visit to the Wrekin. Another by-election was held in November, also won by a Conservative opposed to the coalition, Charles Vere Ferrers Townshend.

References

1920 elections in the United Kingdom
1920 in England
20th century in Shropshire
Telford and Wrekin
By-elections to the Parliament of the United Kingdom in Shropshire constituencies